Andrei Yefimovich Zarin (28 May 1862 – 1929) was a Russian writer of novels, essays and short stories in the late 19th and early 20th century. He was born in St Petersburg in the Russian Empire, graduating from the gymnasium and entering into Vilnius University in modern-day Lithuania in 1879. His first publications were economic articles in the Vilnius Gazette. He started publishing novels and texts in 1881 based in his home city. He was the editor of the journal Stars and Pictorial Review.

In 1906 he was imprisoned for one and a half years. He died in 1929.

Works

Novels

 «Жизнь и сон» (Life and Dreaming) (1891),
 «Дочь пожарного» (Daughter of Fire) (1892),
 «Серые герои» (The Grey Hero) (1893),
 «Силуэты» (Silhouettes) (1897);
 «Призвание» (The Calling) (1897)

Short story collections

 «Говорящая голова» (Talking Head) (1896),
 «Повести и рассказы» (Tales and Stories) (1896),
 «Ложный след» (False Trail) (1896),
 «По призванию» (By Vocation) (1897),
 «Под корень» (Under the Root) (1895),
 «Тотализатор» (Totalisator) (1891),
 «Сорные травы» (Weeds) (1890),
 «Верное сердце» (Faithful Heart) (1897).

External links
 Profile at dic.academic.ru
 Profile at the Russian State Archive of Literature and Art

1862 births
1929 deaths
Writers from Saint Petersburg
Russian male novelists
Russian male short story writers
Vilnius University alumni